Ulverstone Soccer Club, is a soccer club which represents Ulverstone in the Tasmanian Northern Championship. The club also fields teams in all junior divisions, as well as women's teams. Ulverstone play their home games at the Ulverstone Show grounds, in Ulverstone, Tasmania.
 
Ulverstone's only brief period of glory came when they won back-to-back Northern Premierships in 1994, and 1995, local twins Shaun and Adam Conkie who both played with Ulverstone in this period were recruited to the Morwell Falcons in the National Soccer League in 1996. The Ulverstone club have also been state champions once in 1986 winning a play-off final versus White Eagles 2–1 on aggregate.

Honours
State Championship: 1986
Northern Premiership: 1994; 1995

References

Soccer clubs in Tasmania
Ulverstone, Tasmania